KaatiZone is a Bangalore-based chain of Indian fast-food restaurants specializing in Kati Rolls. Founded by Kiran Nadkarni in 2004, the restaurant is famous for its Chicken Tikka and Mixed Veg Rolls. KaatiZone is now owned by Kouzina Foodtech Pvt Ltd. Kouzina Foodtech was founded in the year 2019 by Gautam Balijepalli, Mahesh Madiyala and Sumit Gupta

Locations 
There are 52 cloud kitchens of KaatiZone in 16 cities including Bangalore, Hyderabad, Pune, Delhi and others. KaatiZone continues to one of best sellers of Kaati Rolls across various cities. Inspired by KaatiZone, new brands MomoZone and BiryaniZone  have been launched across all these locations to serve the customers with the best Momos and MoWraps in India.

References

Restaurants in Bangalore
2004 establishments in Karnataka
Restaurants established in 2004
Fast-food chains of India